Sydney Frost (21 January 1881 – 19 December 1952) was an Australian cricketer. He played two first-class matches for Tasmania between 1910 and 1911.

See also
 List of Tasmanian representative cricketers

References

External links
 

1881 births
1952 deaths
Australian cricketers
Tasmania cricketers
Cricketers from Launceston, Tasmania